The Geiranger - Hellesylt Ferry is a ferry service in Norway between the towns of Geiranger and Hellesylt both located in the municipality of Stranda in the county of Møre og Romsdal. The crossing of almost 20 kilometres takes just over an hour. The route passes all the highlights of the Geirangerfjord and is therefore very popular with tourists.

References

Ferry transport in Møre og Romsdal